Esperanto is the main magazine used by the Universal Esperanto Association to inform their members of virtually everything happening in the world related to the international language Esperanto.

History
The magazine was founded in 1905 by the Frenchman Paul Berthelot. In 1907, the Swiss Hector Hodler became editor-in-chief. The post has been held since January 2014 by the Brazilian Fabrício Valle, successor to Stano Marček.  will succeed to Valle in May 2016.

The magazine was not published during the two World Wars. In-between, Edmond Privat was the director.

Contents 
The magazine shows events related to Esperanto, gives interviews of key actors in the Esperanto community, informs about the last published works. There also are opinions, analyses and decisions.

References

External links 
 Dedicated page on the World Esperanto Association website

1905 establishments in the Netherlands
Magazines published in the Netherlands
Esperanto magazines
Magazines established in 1905
Monthly magazines published in the Netherlands
Esperanto in the Netherlands
Mass media in Rotterdam